is the head coach of the Niigata Albirex BB Rabbits in the Women's Japan Basketball League.

Head coaching record

|- 
| style="text-align:left;"|Oita Heat Devils
| style="text-align:left;"|2008-09
| 52||8||44|||| style="text-align:center;"|6th in Western|||-||-||-||
| style="text-align:center;"|-
|- 
| style="text-align:left;"|Rizing Fukuoka
| style="text-align:left;"|2009-10
| 52||30||22|||| style="text-align:center;"|3rd in Western|||2||0||2||
| style="text-align:center;"|Lost in 1st round
|- 
| style="text-align:left;"|Rizing Fukuoka
| style="text-align:left;"|2010-11
| 50||30||20|||| style="text-align:center;"|3rd in Western|||4||2||2||
| style="text-align:center;"|Lost in 2nd round
|- 
| style="text-align:left;"|Rizing Fukuoka
| style="text-align:left;"|2011-12
| 30||19||11|||| style="text-align:center;"|Fired|||-||-||-||
| style="text-align:center;"|-
|- 
| style="text-align:left;"|Niigata Albirex BB Rabbits
| style="text-align:left;"|2016-17
| 27||4||23|||| style="text-align:center;"|11th|||-||-||-||
| style="text-align:center;"|-
|-

References

1969 births
Living people
Akita Isuzu/Isuzu Motors Lynx/Giga Cats players
Ehime Orange Vikings coaches
Ehime Orange Vikings players
Japanese basketball coaches
Niigata Albirex BB players
Rizing Zephyr Fukuoka coaches
Senshu University alumni